Zhuo Qun Song (born 1997), also called Alex Song, is a Chinese-Canadian who is currently the most highly decorated International Mathematical Olympiad (IMO) contestant, with five gold medals and one bronze medal.

Early life 

Song was born in Tianjin, China in 1997. He and his parents moved to Canada in 2002. Song was brought up in Waterloo, Ontario.

Song was interested in mathematics at a very young age where he started participating in competitions in first grade. By fourth grade, Song was participating in competitions such as the Canadian Open Mathematics Challenge and the American Mathematics Competitions. In fifth grade, Song became interested in solving Olympiad type questions and started training to solve them.

In 2011, Song moved to the United States to attend Phillips Exeter Academy.

International Mathematical Olympiad 
In 2010, when Song was in the seventh grade, he represented Vincent Massey Secondary School in the Canadian Mathematical Olympiad where he finished first place.

In the same year, Song represented Canada in the 2010 IMO where he won a Bronze Medal. He would continue to represent Canada for 5 subsequent IMOs where he obtained a gold medal each time. He obtained a perfect score on his final run in 2015, the only contestant to do so that year. The performances made Song the most decorated contestant of all time. In 2015, Song was also one of the twelve top scorers of the United States of America Mathematical Olympiad, representing Phillips Exeter Academy.

Results

Post-IMO 
Song graduated from Phillips Exeter Academy in 2015.

Song attended Princeton University where he graduated in 2019 with a Bachelor of Arts in Mathematics.

During his time at Princeton, Song was part of the team that participated in the Putnam Competition. His team won second place in 2016 and third place in 2017.

Song was previously a Quantitative Researcher at Citadel LLC. He is currently a graduate student at the University of Illinois Urbana–Champaign. He also has been lead coach for Canadian IMO team since 2020.

Publications

See also 
List of International Mathematical Olympiad participants

References

External links

1997 births
Living people
International Mathematical Olympiad participants
Canadian people of Chinese descent
Phillips Exeter Academy alumni
Princeton University alumni
People from Tianjin